René Le Grevès (6 July 1910 – 25 February 1946) was a French professional road bicycle racer. As an amateur cyclist, he won the silver medal at the 1932 Summer Olympics in the team pursuit. In 1933 Le Grevès became professional, and between 1933 and 1939, he won sixteen stages in the Tour de France.

Major results

1932
Silver medal 1932 olympic games, team pursuit
1933
Paris-Caen
Tour de France:
Winner stage 22
1934
Tour de France:
Winner stages 2, 5, 10 and 22A
1935
Circuit de Paris
Circuit du Morbihan
Critérium International
Paris–Tours
Tour de France:
Winner stages 14A, 18A, 19A and 20A
1936
 national road race championship
Tour de France:
Winner stages 5, 12, 13A, 14A, 17 and 20A
1937
Critérium International
1938
Paris-Caen
1939
Paris-Sedan
Tour de France:
Winner stage 18A

References

External links

Official Tour de France results for René Le Grèves

French male cyclists
1910 births
1946 deaths
French Tour de France stage winners
Cyclists at the 1932 Summer Olympics
Olympic cyclists of France
Olympic silver medalists for France
French track cyclists
Olympic medalists in cycling
Cyclists from Paris
Medalists at the 1932 Summer Olympics